Apulia First of All (La Puglia Prima di Tutto, PPT) is a regionalist-centrist political party in Italy active in Apulia, as local branch of Forza Italia.

The party was launched in 2005 as a civic list in support of Raffaele Fitto, the outgoing President of the Region of Forza Italia. In the 2005 regional election PPT gained 9.2% of the vote and 5 seats in the Regional Council, while Fitto was defeated by Nichi Vendola.

The party has since organized on a stable basis and gained some autonomy from Fitto, although it can be considered a sort of sister-party of The People of Freedom, the party in which Fitto and Forza Italia merged in 2009. Since then PPT is led by Salvatore Greco, a former deputy of the Union of Christian and Centre Democrats.  In the 2010 regional election the party obtained 7.1% and 4 regional councillors, including Greco.

2005 establishments in Italy
Political parties established in 2005
Political parties in Apulia